Swanhilde of Ungarnmark (Swanhilde von der Ungarnmark; died 1120) was an Austrian royal consort as Margravine of Austria.

Family
She was a daughter of Sighard VII of Ungarnmark and his wife, Philihild.

In 1072, she married Ernest, Margrave of Austria; becoming his second wife. They had no children together.

Swanhilde died in 1120.

References

Austrian royal consorts
Babenberg
1120 deaths
Date of birth unknown
11th-century births